Uhlenbach may refer to:

Uhlenbach (Werre), a river of North Rhine-Westphalia, Germany, tributary of the Werre
Uhlenbach (Selke), a river of Saxony-Anhalt, Germany, tributary of the Selke
Großer Uhlenbach, a river of Saxony-Anhalt, Germany, tributary of the Uhlenbach
Kleiner Uhlenbach, name of the Uhlenbach in its upper course